Tegaipil Island is an island located in eastern Sabah on the Sulu Sea on Malaysia. It is part of the Sugud Islands Marine Conservation Area (SIMCA) together with Billean and Lankayan.

References

External links 
 Pulau Tegipil (Tegaipil) on getamap.net
 Map including Pulau Tegipil

Islands of Sabah